Raymond J. Kempe (born January 24, 1931) was an American lawyer and politician.

Kempe was born in Saint Paul, Minnesota and went to Humboldt Senior High School in Saint Paul. He lived in West St. Paul, Minnesota with his wife and family. Kempe received his bachelor's degree from University of Minnesota and his Juris Doctor degree from University of Minnesota Law School. Kempe was admitted to the Minnesota bar. Kempe served in the Minnesota House of Representatives from 1973 to 1980 and was a Democrat. His brother Arnold E. Kempe also served in the Minnesota Legislature.

References

1931 births
Living people
Politicians from Saint Paul, Minnesota
People from West St. Paul, Minnesota
Minnesota lawyers
University of Minnesota alumni
University of Minnesota Law School alumni
Democratic Party members of the Minnesota House of Representatives